Cerrada is a surname. Notable people with the surname include:

Fernando Cerrada (born 1954), Spanish long-distance runner 
Jonatan Cerrada (born 1985), Moreno, Belgian singer